The term New Athenian School, also known as the 1880s Generation (Γενιά του 1880) or the Palamian School (Παλαμική Σχολή) after its leading member Kostis Palamas, denotes the literary production in Athens after 1880. It was a reaction against the First Athenian School and its main aim was the use of Demotic Greek instead of Katharevousa.

The influence of Palamas led many Greek writers who were using the Katharevousa, like Aristomenis Provelengios and Jean Moréas, to abandon it and adopt the Demotic.

General traits
Some general traits of the school were:
The use of Demotic Greek
Anti-rhetorical style and anti-romanticism
Influence by Parnassianism and Symbolism
Folklore and everyday-life themes

Notable representatives
Georgios Drosinis
Ioannis Gryparis
Kostas Krystallis
Kostis Palamas
Alexandros Pallis
Ioannis Polemis
Emmanuel Rhoides
Georgios Souris
Georgios Stratigis

Notable works
 The Papess Joanne (1866), novel by Emmanuel Rhoides
 Vipers and Turtledoves (1878), poetry collection by Jean Moréas
 Songs of my Fatherland (1886), poetry collection by Kostis Palamas
 The King's flute (1910) by Kostis Palamas

References 
R. Beaton, An Introduction to Modern Greek Literature, Oxford University Press, 1999.
M. Vitti, Ιστορία της Νεοελληνικής Λογοτεχνίας [History of Modern Greek Literature], ed. Οδυσσέας, Athens, 2003.

 
Kostis Palamas